This is a list of Institute of Standards and Industrial Research of Iran (ISIRI) standards. For a complete and up-to-date list of all the ISIRI standards (more than 14,000, as of February 2011), see the ISIRI Search Index.

The National Committees (of) 

There are separate national committees for developing standards.

Power and Electricity

Civil Engineering, Building Materials, and Products

Food and Agricultural Products

Clothing, Fiber, and Textile Products

Chemical and Polymer Industries
 IRIRI2115

Wood, Packed Paper, and Cellulose Products

Mineral Materials

Motor Vehicles

 ISIRI 4243 Permissible sound level and the exhaust system of motor vehicles
 ISIRI 6482 Audible warning devices for motor vehicles
 ISIRI 6484 Speed limitation devices or similar speed limitation on-board systems of certain categories of motor vehicles
 ISIRI 6494 Retro-reflectors for motor vehicles and their trailers
 ISIRI 6505 Direction indicator lamps for motor vehicles and their trailers
 ISIRI 6603 Two-wheeled motorcycles – parking stability of side and center stands
 ISIRI 6651 The end-outline marker lamps, front position (side) lamps, rear position (side) lamps and stop lamps for motor vehicles and their trailers
 ISIRI 6653 motorcycles' engine test code and net power
 ISIRI 6672 motor vehicle headlamps which function as main-beam and/or dippedbeam headlamps and to incandescent electric filament lamps for such headlamps
 ISIRI 6701 Measurements of motorcycles' maximum speed
 ISIRI 6702 Measurements of mopeds' maximum speed
 ISIRI 6703 Test and measurement methods of mopeds' brakes and braking devices
 ISIRI 6704 Test and measurement methods of motorcycles' brakes and braking devices
 ISIRI 6788 Two-wheeled motorcycles – Positioning of lighting and light-signalling devices
 ISIRI 6862 Mopeds' engine test code and net power
 ISIRI 6894 Safety glazing and glazing materials on motor vehicles and their trailers
 ISIRI 6924 The type approval of motor vehicles and their trailers
 ISIRI 7076 Motorcycles-measurement method for moment of inertia
 ISIRI 7077 Motorcycle tyres – Test methods for verifying tyre capabilities
 ISIRI 7078 Motorcycles-measurement method for location of centre of gravity
 ISIRI 7080 Motorcycle tyres – Method of measuring rolling resistance
 ISIRI 7083 Mopeds-measurement method for moment of inertia
 ISIRI 7558 The type approval of two or three-wheel motor vehicles
 ISIRI 8314 Masses and dimensions of two or three-wheel motor vehicles
 ISIRI 8315 Speedometers for two or three-wheel motor vehicles
 ISIRI 8316 Protective devices intended to prevent the unauthorized use of two or three-wheel motor vehicles
 ISIRI 8317 Statutory markings for two or three wheel motor vehicles
 ISIRI 8318 Registration plate of two or three-wheel motor vehicles
 ISIRI 8319 Passenger hand-holds on two-wheel motor vehicles
 ISIRI 13133 Certain components and characteristics of wheeled agricultural or forestry tractors
 ISIRI 13134 Operating space, access to the driving position and the doors and windows of wheeled agricultural or forestry tractors
 ISIRI 13135 The installation, location, operation and identification of the controls of wheeled agricultural or forestry tractors
 ISIRI 13136 Rear-mounted roll over protection structures of narrow-track wheeled agricultural and forestry tractors
 ISIRI 13137 Roll over protection structures mounted in front of the driver's seat on narrowtrack wheeled agricultural and forestry tractors
 ISIRI 13138 The identification of controls, tell-tales and indicators for two- or three-wheel motor vehicles
 ISIRI 13139 Installation of lighting and light-signalling devices on wheeled agricultural and forestry tractors
 ISIRI 13140 Driver's seat on wheeled agricultural or forestry tractors
 ISIRI 13141 Roll-over protection structures of wheeled agricultural or forestry tractors (static testing)
 ISIRI 13142 Driver-perceived noise level of wheeled agricultural or forestry tractors
 ISIRI 13143 Measures to be taken against emission of pollutants from diesel engines for use in wheeled agricultural or forestry tractors
 ISIRI 13144 Certain parts and characteristics of wheeled agricultural or forestry tractors
 ISIRI 13145 Braking devices of wheeled agricultural or forestry tractors
 ISIRI 13146 Steering equipment of wheeled agricultural or forestry tractors
 ISIRI 13150 The component type-approval of lighting and lightsignalling devices on wheeled agricultural or forestry tractors
 ISIRI 13151 Maximum design speed of and load platforms for wheeled agricultural or forestry tractors
 ISIRI 13152 Rear-view mirrors for wheeled agricultural or forestry tractors
 ISIRI 13262 stands for two-wheel motor vehicles
 ISIRI 13263 Braking of two or three-wheel motor vehicles

Measurements and Scales

Medical Engineering

Biology and Microbiology

Official, Educational Documents, and Equipment

Leather, Skins, and Coverings

Quality Management

Data Processing and Computers

Packaging

TCT (Tele-Communication Technology)

Toys and Children's Educational Games Safety

Mechanic and Metallurgy

See also
 List of International Organization for Standardization standards
 List of European Union directives

References

 
ISIRI standards
ISIRI standards